Julie Caroline Hollman (born 16 February 1977 in Peterborough) is an English heptathlete.

She grew up in Deeping St James, attending The Deepings School. Her sister Anne was also a heptathlete. Her mother Carol was a team manager at Peterborough Athletic Club. She has a BSC in Sports Science with Geography and Environmental Issues from Brunel University.

She finished fifth at the 2002 Commonwealth Games, fourteenth at the 2003 World Championships, sixth at the 2006 Commonwealth Games. and 32nd in the 2008 Olympic Games.
She is the British record holder for the contested Women's Decathlon.

Her personal best result is 6135 points, achieved in June 2002 in Götzis. She is a member of Birchfield Harriers.

References
 
 2006 Commonwealth Games profile
 BBC Profile

1977 births
Living people
Sportspeople from Peterborough
People from the Deepings
British heptathletes
English heptathletes
British female athletes
English female athletes
Olympic athletes of Great Britain
Athletes (track and field) at the 2008 Summer Olympics
Commonwealth Games competitors for England
Athletes (track and field) at the 2002 Commonwealth Games
Athletes (track and field) at the 2006 Commonwealth Games
World Athletics Championships athletes for Great Britain
Alumni of Brunel University London